Joseph Brian Junkin (September 8, 1946 – January 11, 2014) was a Canadian professional ice hockey goaltender who played in one National Hockey League game for the Boston Bruins during the 1968–69 season, and 68 games in the World Hockey Association with the New York Golden Blades/Jersey Knights and San Diego Mariners between 1973 and 1975. His one game was on December 14, 1968 when he played 9 minutes against the Chicago Black Hawks. The rest of his career, which lasted from 1968 to 1975, was spent in various minor leagues. He died of cancer on January 11, 2014.

Career statistics

Regular season and playoffs

See also
List of players who played only one game in the NHL

References

External links

1946 births
2014 deaths
Boston Bruins players
Canadian expatriate ice hockey players in the United States
Canadian ice hockey goaltenders
Hershey Bears players
Ice hockey people from Ontario
Jersey Knights players
New York Golden Blades players
Oklahoma City Blazers (1965–1977) players
Ontario Hockey Association Senior A League (1890–1979) players
Roanoke Valley Rebels (SHL) players
San Diego Mariners players
Sportspeople from Kawartha Lakes
Syracuse Blazers players
Tidewater Sharks players